Josef Grün (sometimes shown as Joseph Grün) was a West German bobsledder who competed in the mid-1950s. He won a bronze medal in the four-man event at the 1954 FIBT World Championships in Cortina d'Ampezzo.

References
Bobsleigh four-man world championship medalists since 1930

German male bobsledders
Possibly living people
Year of birth missing